Charles Richard Stone was a professional baseball player who appeared in three games in  for the Washington Senators. Prior to his short stint in the Major Leagues, Stone spent several seasons in the farm system of the Brooklyn Dodgers.

Stone died in his hometown of Oklahoma City, Oklahoma on February 18, 1980.

External links

1911 births
1980 deaths
Major League Baseball pitchers
Baseball players from Oklahoma
Sportspeople from Oklahoma City
Oklahoma City Stars baseball players
Washington Senators (1901–1960) players
Oklahoma City Indians players
Dayton Ducks players